There were one female and no male athletes representing the country at the 2000 Summer Paralympics.

See also
2000 Summer Paralympics

References

Bibliography

External links
International Paralympic Committee

Nations at the 2000 Summer Paralympics
Paralympics
2000